The 1924 U.S. Open was the 28th U.S. Open, held June 5–6 at Oakland Hills Country Club in Birmingham, Michigan, a suburb northwest of Detroit. Cyril Walker, a relatively unknown Englishman, won his only major title at the South Course, three strokes ahead of runner-up Bobby Jones, the defending champion.

After the first two rounds of play on Thursday, Jones shared the lead with Bill Mehlhorn, with Walker a shot back. Walker shot a third consecutive 74 in the third round to tie Jones after 54 holes, with Mehlhorn one back. Jones and Mehlhorn, playing ahead of Walker in the final round, both played poorly, each carding 78. Leading by three on the 15th, Walker made bogey but then responded with a birdie on 16. He parred the final two holes to secure the championship.

This was the high point of Walker's golf career. He never won another significant title, and it was his only top ten finish in the U.S. Open; his next best finish in a major was the semifinals of the PGA Championship in 1921. A heavy drinker, Walker wound up working as a caddy and a dishwasher; unable to afford a room, he died in a New Jersey jail cell of pneumonia in 1948 at age 56.

This was the first of nine major championships held at the South Course through 2017; six U.S. Opens and three PGA Championships.

Course layout

South Course 

Source:

Past champions in the field 

Source:

Round summaries

First round
Thursday, June 5, 1924 (morning)

Source:

Second round
Thursday, June 5, 1924 (afternoon)

Source:

Third round
Friday, June 6, 1924 (morning)

Source:

Final round
Friday, June 6, 1924 (afternoon)

Source:

Amateurs: Jones (+12), Evans (+19), Guilford (+29), Sweet (+55).

References

External links
USGA Championship Database
USOpen.com - 1924

U.S. Open (golf)
Golf in Michigan
Bloomfield Hills, Michigan
U.S. Open
U.S. Open
U.S. Open
June 1924 sports events